Abu 'l-Abbas Abdallah II (Abū l-ʿAbbās ʿAbd Allāh; died 27 July 903) was the Emir of Ifriqiya from 902 to 903.

Mounting reports of the cruel atrocities of his father Ibrahim II made their way to Baghdad, prompting the Abbasid Caliph al-Mu'tadid to finally react. The Caliph dispatched a messenger who arrived in Tunis in late 901/early 902 with his written instructions.  Citing the mistreatment of his subjects, the Caliph recalled Ibrahim II to Baghdad and deprived him of the governorship of Ifriqiya, appointing in his stead his son Abu al-Abbas Abdallah (then on campaign in Sicily).

Surprisingly, Ibrahim II dutifully accepted the news without objection.  With apparently genuine repentance, donning the garments of a penitent and declaring a pious change of heart, Ibrahim II remitted tributes, abolished illegal taxes, opened his jails, manumitted his slaves, and delivered a large chunk of his treasury to the jurists of Kairouan to distribute to the needy. Ibrahim II abdicated his power to his son Abu al-Abbas Abdallah, who returned from Sicily in February–March 902 to assume title as the new emir Abdallah.

Abdallah took over the Emirate after his father Abu Ishaq Ibrahim II was forced to abdicate after a tyrannical rule. He immediately set about trying to reduce the autonomy of the Kutama Berbers in order to stop the Ismailite mission of Abu 'Abdullah al-Shi'i, but without success. An effort to replace the Malikite law schools with Hanifites from Iraq also failed. Abdullah was murdered by his son Abu Muda Ziyadat Allah in 903.

References

9th-century births
903 deaths
Year of birth unknown
Aghlabid emirs of Ifriqiya
Assassinated royalty
10th-century monarchs in Africa
10th-century Arabs
Arab people of the Arab–Byzantine wars
People of the Muslim conquest of Sicily
10th-century people of Ifriqiya